Siminoc (“Helichrysum arenarium”) may refer to several villages in Romania:

 Siminoc, a village in Murfatlar town, Constanța County
 Siminoc, a village in Dumitrești Commune, Vrancea County